is a Japanese manga series written and illustrated by Yuko Osada. It was serialized in Kodansha's Weekly Shōnen Magazine from December 2004 to October 2005, with its chapters collected in five tankōbon volumes. It is the story of a young rambunctious teenage boy named Kakashi exploring his world with his friends. The series was licensed for English release in North America by Del Rey Manga.

Plot
Kakashi is a young islander who has always dreamed of leaving his island and exploring the world; A world radically changed because of the world war from 50 years ago. His father, a famous world traveler leaves him alone at home in their Light House. After a brief period of time, Kakashi receives his father's journal which prompts him to travel the world like his father, whom many people say is dead.

He is so determined to leave his little island home behind, that he stows away on board a marvelous zeppelin. Unknown to him, this zeppelin just happens to be loaded with  treasure and is hijacked by a gang of ruthless criminals known as the Man Chicken Family. There he meets a small puppy which harbors magical powers. Kakashi befriends the puppy despite it being unknown to him. After being discovered by the gang that has hijacked the Zeppelin, he befriends their leader.

He arrives in the main continent of "Oz", where he begins his travels after the Zeppelin is shot down by the Nassau Imperial Army. After crashing in a field, he and his small puppy meet a teenage girl named Dorothy. She immediately falls in love with the puppy and names him ToTo. Almost immediately, they are confronted by Imperial troops whom Dorothy is able to dispatch with her unique "Tornado" martial arts moves. The three agree to travel together to Emerald City where Dorothy is heading to visit her parents during her time off from school. Kakashi, ToTo and Dorothy begin their wonderful adventure but are faced with various foes that quest for the strange dog collar that ToTo is wearing.

A Nassau officer in disguise of an old man, dupes the trio into letting their guard down and he, in turn, snatches ToTo.  With Kakashi and Dorothy in danger and ToTo feeling threatened, ToTo's full power is openly revealed as he turns into a gigantic magic dragon which proceeds to defeat the soldiers. Their adventures continue as they continue to Emerald City where they meet an ex-Imperial Soldier turned performer named Noil.  They proceed on down the transcontinental railroad line named "Yellow Brick Road".

Characters
Kakashi - A young teenage boy, who after receiving his father's journal, sets out to see the world.
ToTo - A little dog, which the Nassau Imperial Army were using to experiment with one of the "Artifacts", he is later discovered by Kakashi and freed.
Dorothy - A lonely Student from Kansas Academy, who is a skilled martial artist.
Noil - An exNassau soldier turned showman ... but has stage fright.
Alice - A gangster leader, who joins Kakashi after he and his friends help fight the evil Rabbit Gang.

Publication
Written and illustrated by Yuko Osada, Toto!: The Wonderful Adventure was serialized in Kodansha's Weekly Shōnen Magazine from December 8, 2004, to October 26, 2005. Kodansha collected its chapters in five tankōbon volumes, released from April 15 to November 17, 2005.

The series was licensed for English release in North America by Del Rey Manga. The five volumes were released from May 15, 2008, to March 2009.

Volume list

Reception
The manga's American release was favorably reviewed by Deb Aoki of About Entertainment.

See also
 Shiori Experience, another manga series by Yuko Osada

References

External links
 Shonen Magazine ToTo! website 
 Active Anime's review of Volume Three of ToTo!
 

2004 manga
Adventure anime and manga
Del Rey Manga
Fantasy anime and manga
Kodansha manga
Shōnen manga